This is a list of all lighthouses in the U.S. state of Wisconsin as identified by the United States Coast Guard and other historical sources. 

If not otherwise noted, focal height and coordinates are taken from the United States Coast Guard Light List, while location and dates of activation, automation, and deactivation are taken from the United States Coast Guard Historical information site for lighthouses.

References

Wisconsin
 
Lighthouses